In the 2013–14 season, the Cymru Alliance, a football league in Wales, was won by Cefn Druids, who thus won promotion to the Welsh Premier League.

Promotion and relegation 
Two teams were promoted into the league from 2012-13 Feeder Leagues: Llanidloes Town, the Mid Wales Football League champions, and Caernarfon Town, the Welsh Alliance League champions.

No teams joined the league as a result of relegation from the 2012–13 Welsh Premier League.

Stadia and locations

League table

Results 
Each team played every other team twice (once at home, and once away) for a total of 30 games.

Notes

References 
 http://www.welshpremier.co.uk/ThePyramid.ink
 https://web.archive.org/web/20100825182246/http://huwsgrayalliance.pitchero.com/tables.php
 https://web.archive.org/web/20131128050550/http://huwsgrayalliance.pitchero.com/results.php

Cymru Alliance seasons
2
Wales